Breathing Space are a band formed in 2006 by Mostly Autumn keyboardist Iain Jennings. Some of the members had played on his solo album and formed a band to tour this record. They became a full-time band in 2007 when they released their first album as a band. This was called Coming Up for Air.

Mark Rowen left the band in early 2009 and was replaced by Mostly Autumn guitarist Liam Davison, but he was then in turn replaced by Bryan Josh after playing only three live shows with the band. Bryan's appointment was only temporary and the band placed an advertisement  in Classic Rock Magazine in an attempt to find a permanent replacement.

During Liam's stint with the band, they recorded their second album as a whole band which is titled Below the Radar. This was released in August 2009, with a special pre-release run of 100 copies selling out at the Cambridge Rock Festival.

It was announced in January 2010 that both Olivia Sparnenn and Bryan Josh would be leaving the band to concentrate on Mostly Autumn after the departure of lead vocalist Heather Findlay.

In July 2010, Heidi Widdop and Adam Dawson were announced as new members of the band. This new line up of the band debuted at the Cambridge Rock Festival in August 2010, and played a new song 'My Lips are too Dry'. Another new song, 'Unnatural Disaster', was played at later shows. However this new line up of the band was short-lived as after only a handful of gigs, Breathing Space decided to disband in January 2011. Heidi Widdop, Adam Dawson, Paul Teasdale and Barry Cassells, all members of the final incarnation of Breathing Space, formed a new band called Stolen Earth later that year.

Personnel

Members

Iain Jennings – keyboards, synths, backing vocals (2005-2011)
Olivia Sparnenn – lead vocals, acoustic guitars, percussion (2005-2010)
Andrew Jennings – drums (2005-2007)
Liam Davison - lead guitars, bass guitars (2005-2006, 2009)
Bryan Josh – lead guitars (2005-2006, 2009-2010)
Alex Hogg – lead guitars (2006)
Andy Smith - bass guitars (2006)
Ben Jennings – keyboards, percussion (2006-2011)
Paul Teasdale – bass guitars, backing vocals (2006-2011)

Mark Rowen – lead guitars, backing vocals (2006-2009)
Howard Sparnenn – drums (2007)
Gary 'Harry' James - drums (2007)
Barry Cassells – drums (2007-2011)
John Hart – saxophone, flute, wind synth (2007-2009)
Anne-Marie Helder - flute (2009-2010)
Adam Dawson - lead guitars, backing vocals (2010-2011)
Heidi Widdop - lead vocals, acoustic guitars, percussion (2010-2011)

Lineups

Discography
Studio
Coming Up for Air (2007)
Below the Radar (2009)

Live
Below the Radar Live (2010)

External links
Official website

British progressive rock groups